The Law and the Lady is a 1951 American comedy film directed by Edwin H. Knopf and starring Greer Garson, Michael Wilding (as twin brothers) and Fernando Lamas. It is not related to the Wilkie Collins novel The Law and the Lady. Very loosely based on the 1925 play The Last of Mrs. Cheyney by Frederick Lonsdale, the action is transferred to the turn of the century, the names are all changed, and the first half of the film shows the history of the two thieves. Previous film versions of the story, made in 1929, starring Norma Shearer,  and 1937, starring Joan Crawford, retained the play's contemporary setting, included a crew of confederates, and opened with Mrs. Cheyney as an established figure in society.. This film also ends differently from the play, with the partners in crime ending as romantic partners but going back to England to face the music for their very first swindle. In the play and in the two other films, Charles leaves and Mrs. Cheyney accepts Lord Dilling, who kisses her and declares: “That's the Last of Mrs. Cheyney!”

Plot
Jane Hoskins (Garson) has worked most of her life as a lady's maid, and is currently employed by Lord Minden (Wilding) and his haughty wife Lady Sybil Minden. Lord Minden's younger twin brother, The Honourable Nigel Duxbury (Wilding) received only ten thousand pounds to his brother's five million because his brother was born five minutes before him and is therefore seen as being the elder sibling in the eyes of the law. Having squandered his money, Nigel sneaks into his brother's home and steals Lady Minden's earrings. Lady Minden accuses her maid Jane of the theft until Nigel steps forward and claims responsibility. Jane is angry at being wrongly accused of theft by her employer and decides to quit her job and make her way into high society.

Nigel is impressed by Jane's attitude and, after securing the earrings in return for never bothering his brother again, he offers to take Jane out for an evening of fine dining. Together they unintentionally con a wealthy gentleman into believing that Jane is a wealthy widow, the Lady Lovely, and that she collects donations for a fictional Egyptian charity called The Nile Fund. At the end of the night, one hundred pounds wealthier, Jane makes a business arrangement with Nigel that the two of them should work together as confidence tricksters.

Jane and Nigel travel to Monte Carlo, San Remo and Shanghai, where they cheat at gambling and are repeatedly asked by the authorities to leave the country. Eventually they make their way to San Francisco, where Nigel suggests they move into jewelry theft. Nigel gets himself a job as a butler named 'Hoskin's in the house of society queen Julia Wortin (Marjorie Main), and Jane befriends Mrs Wortin, and is invited to the Wortin home as a guest. The two partners plan to lift Julia's diamond necklace during their stay.

Julia throws a party in Jane's honour, and her exotic neighbor Juan (Lamas) begins to woo Jane. Jane becomes somewhat swept off her feet at Juan's attentions to her, causing Nigel to become jealous. On the first night of her stay, Jane locates Julia's safe and the necklace, but is touched by the lady's kindness towards her and has second thoughts about their plan, so she does not go through with it. The following day Jane receives a proposal from Juan and decides to accept. Jane and Nigel argue about Jane's decision, and although they share a kiss, they are reluctant to admit their feelings for one another, having long ago agreed that theirs was a strictly business relationship.

Jane decides to steal the necklace and give it to Nigel because she is worried about his future now that she will no longer be his partner in crime. Juan sees her give the necklace to Nigel and has already discovered that she is not really Lady Lovely. Juan and his servant apprehend Nigel, and Juan forces himself into Jane's room, where she activates the burglar alarm. Realising that Juan is not going to give her away, Jane reveals that she is a thief to Julia. Nigel turns up with a letter from one of Julia's other house guests which contains libelous information with which he and Jane can blackmail Julia and her guests if they decide to turn Jane and Nigel over to the police. The guests bid for ownership of the libelous letter, but Jane decides to give it to Juan for free for his kindness. Julia thinks the whole evening has been a bit of excitement and asks Jane and Nigel to stay on.

The following morning, after fighting over Jane the night before, Juan and Nigel inform Jane that they have decided Juan should be the one she ends up with. Jane reveals her true love for Nigel by yelling at him for letting her down and revealing that she has always loved him but that he was "too stupid to know it". Juan bows out gracefully and Jane and Nigel decide to go straight and pay back everyone they have stolen money from. Just as they are about to leave the local sheriff shows up with an inspector from Scotland Yard who reveals that Lord Minden died in a grouse shooting accident and that Nigel is now Lord Minden and receives the fortune. Nigel and Jane are now wealthy, however they are both under arrest for their initial deception of gaining the one hundred pounds for The Nile Fund. The film ends with them happily going off to do their short jail term before living happily ever after.

Cast
 Greer Garson as Jane Hoskins
 Michael Wilding as twin brothers, Nigel Duxbury (who masquerades as the butler Hoskins) and Lord Minden
 Fernando Lamas as Juan Dinas
 Marjorie Main as Julia Wortin
 Hayden Rorke as Tracy Collans
 Margalo Gillmore as Cora Caighn
 Ralph Dumke as James Horace Caighn
 Rhys Williams as Inspector McGraw
 Phyllis Stanley as Lady Sybil Minden
 Natalie Schafer as Pamela Pemberson
 Bess Flowers as Mrs. Bruno Thayer
 Holmes Herbert as English Colonel
 Stuart Holmes as Mr. Bruno Thayer 
 Matt Moore as Senator Scholmm 
 Anna Q. Nilsson as Mrs. Scholmm
 Jean Del Val as Dealer (uncredited)
 Lester Dorr as Newspaperman (uncredited)

Reception
According to MGM the movie earned $563,000 in the US and Canada and $797,000 elsewhere, resulting in a loss of $395,000.

See also

 The Last of Mrs. Cheyney (1929 film) - starring Norma Shearer
 The Last of Mrs. Cheyney (1937 film) - starring Joan Crawford

References

External links

The Last of Mrs Cheyney (play) at The Internet Archive
 The Last of Mrs Cheyney (1929) at TCM.com
 The Last of Mrs. Cheyney  (1937) at TCM.com

 
 
 
 

1951 films
1950s romantic comedy-drama films
American black-and-white films
American romantic comedy-drama films
Remakes of American films
1950s English-language films
American films based on plays
Films directed by Edwin H. Knopf
Films scored by Carmen Dragon
Films set in London
Metro-Goldwyn-Mayer films
1951 comedy films
1951 drama films
1950s American films